Fabio Baldato (born 13 June 1968) is an Italian former racing cyclist. In 2008, he was the oldest rider in a ProTour team. His cycling career ended when he crashed heavily in the Eneco Tour. He also competed at the 1988 Summer Olympics and the 1996 Summer Olympics.

Major results

1986
 1st  Road race, National Junior Road Championships
1989
 6th Gran Premio della Liberazione
1990
 1st Trofeo Città di Castelfidardo
1991
 6th Trofeo Pantalica
1992
 5th Omloop Het Volk
 10th Kuurne–Brussels–Kuurne
1993
 Giro d'Italia
1st Stages 4, 16 & 21 
 1st Stage 3a Ronde van Nederland
 1st Stage 1 Setmana Catalana de Ciclisme
 10th Paris–Tours
1994
 Paris–Nice
1st Stages 2 & 4 
 2nd Paris–Roubaix
 6th Tour of Flanders
 6th Milan–San Remo
 7th E3 Prijs Vlaanderen
1995
 Tour de France
1st Stage 1 
Held  after Stage 1 
 1st Stage 8a Paris–Nice
 1st Stage 1 Volta a la Comunitat Valenciana
 1st Stage 2 Tour Méditerranéen
 1st Stage 2 Three Days of De Panne
 1st Stage 4 Hofbräu Cup
 2nd Tour of Flanders
 3rd Trofeo Luis Puig
 3rd Trofeo Laigueglia
 3rd Omloop van de Vlaamse Scheldeboorden
 4th Leeds International Classic
 5th GP Rik Van Steenbergen
 7th Paris–Roubaix
 7th Züri-Metzgete
 10th Milan–San Remo
1996
 1st Coppa Bernocchi
 Vuelta a España
1st Stages 6 & 7 
Held  after Stages 6–9
 1st Stage 21 Tour de France
 1st Stage 3a Tour de Luxembourg
 2nd Overall Tour Méditerranéen
 2nd Tour of Flanders
 3rd Overall Étoile de Bessèges
 3rd Gent–Wevelgem
 4th Grand Prix d'Ouverture La Marseillaise
 5th Overall Three Days of De Panne
 6th Milan–San Remo
 7th Road race, Olympic Games
 7th Clásica de San Sebastián
 8th Züri-Metzgete
1997
 2nd Giro dell'Etna
 2nd Gran Premio della Costa Etruschi
1998
 1st Rund um den Henninger-Turm
 1st Stage 2 Tour de Romandie
 5th Giro del Veneto
 6th Overall Giro di Puglia
 6th Classic Haribo
 7th GP Rik Van Steenbergen
 9th Omloop Het Volk
 10th Gent–Wevelgem
 10th Züri-Metzgete
1999
 1st Stage 2 Danmark Rundt
 3rd Paris–Brussels
 5th Overall Tour Méditerranéen
1st Stage 6 
 7th Paris–Tours
 7th Trofeo Laigueglia
 8th Giro del Friuli
2000
 1st Stage 2 Paris–Nice
 2nd Milan–San Remo
 3rd HEW Cyclassics
 6th Criterium d'Abruzzo
2001
 1st Stage 5 Tour de Luxembourg
 4th Paris–Brussels
 8th HEW Cyclassics
2002
 1st Trofeo Pantalica
 1st Trofeo dell'Etna
 1st Stage 3a Three Days of De Panne
 1st Stage 2 Giro Riviera Ligure Ponente
 1st Stage 1 (TTT) Tour Méditerranéen
 6th HEW Cyclassics
2003
 1st  Overall Étoile de Bessèges
1st Stage 1 
 1st Stage 2 Giro d'Italia
 1st Stage 2 Tour de Pologne
 Three Days of De Panne
1st  Points classification 
1st Stage 2
 3rd Trofeo Laigueglia
 3rd Giro della Provincia di Reggio Calabria
 4th Tour of Flanders
 6th Gran Premio Bruno Beghelli
 7th HEW Cyclassics
2004 
 Tour de Pologne
1st Stages 1 & 4 
 2nd Gran Premio Bruno Beghelli 
 3rd Grand Prix d'Ouverture La Marseillaise
 10th E3 Prijs Vlaanderen
2006
 1st Stage 2 Tour of Austria
 1st Stage 1 Niedersachsen Rundfahrt
 1st Stage 1 (TTT) Tour de Pologne
 10th Paris–Roubaix
2008
 10th Paris–Roubaix

Grand Tour general classification results timeline

References

External links

1968 births
Living people
Italian male cyclists
Italian Tour de France stage winners
Italian Giro d'Italia stage winners
Italian Vuelta a España stage winners
Olympic cyclists of Italy
Cyclists at the 1988 Summer Olympics
Cyclists at the 1996 Summer Olympics
Cyclists from the Province of Vicenza
Tour de France Champs Elysées stage winners
20th-century Italian people